was an Okinawan, Japanese martial artist. He is the founder of Isshin-ryū ("One Heart Style") style of karate.)

From childhood until World War II

Family
Tatsuo Shimabukuro was born in Gushikawa village, Okinawa on September 19, 1908. He was the first of ten children born into a farming family. He began his study of karate at the age of 13 from his uncle, who lived a few miles away from him in Agena Village. His uncle initially sent him back home, but after seeing how dedicated his nephew was he took him on as a pupil. His uncle later sent him to study with Chotoku Kyan to further study karate because he thought Tatsuo's training was incomplete.

Eizo Shimabukuro (b. 1925) was Tatsuo's younger brother, who also excelled in martial arts. Eizo studied under his elder brother, Tatsuo, and is said to have also studied under the same masters as Tatsuo, such as Chotoku Kyan,  Chojun Miyagi, Choki Motobu, and Shinken Taira. While the older brother went on to create his own new style of karate, Eizo quickly moved up the ranks in Shōrin-ryū (Shōbayashi).

Learning years

By the time Shimabukuro was a teenager, he had attained the physical level of a person six years his senior. His karate training, and work on the family farm, gave him physical strength. He excelled in athletic events on the island. By the time he was 17, he was consistently winning in two of his favorite events, the javelin throw and the high jump.

Around the age of 19 (1927), he began to study Shorin-ryu karate under Chotoku Kyan at Kyan's home in the village of Yomitan. Kyan also taught at the Okinawa Prefectural Agricultural School. Within a short time, Shimabukuro became one of Kyan's best students and learned the kata: Seisan, Naihanchi, Wansu, Chinto and Kusanku, along with the weapons kata Tokumine nu kun and basic Sai. He also began his study of "Ki" (or "Chinkuchi; (チンクチ)" in the Okinawan dialect) for which Kyan was most well known. Shimabukuro studied with Kyan until 1939.

Shimabukuro had always been fascinated by Naha-te karate (Goju Ryu) and sought out Chojun Miyagi, the founder of Goju Ryu. Miyagi's teacher had been Higaonna Kanryo (also called Higashionna) who brought from China a derivative of Kenpo (拳法) called 'kin gai'. Pangai Noon was the bearer of Uechi-ryu from China to Okinawa. Eventually this became Naha-te. From Miyagi, Tatsuo learned Tensho, Seiunchin ("Seize-Control-Fight") kata and Sanchin ("Three-Fights/Conflicts") kata.

Prior to studying with Miyagi, Shimabukuro, in 1942, sought out another famous Shorin-Ryu instructor, Choki Motobu, who was probably the most colorful of all of Shimabukuro's instructors. Motobu had had many teachers for short periods of time, including some notable ones such as Anko Itosu (Shuri-te), Sokon Matsumura, and Kosaku Matsumora (Tomari-te). Motobu was known for often getting into street fights in his youth to promote the effectiveness of karate. Shimabukuro studied with Motobu for approximately one year.

Shimabukuro opened his first dojo in 1946 after the war in the village of Konbu, near Tengan village.

From World War II until death

Turning point
Coming from a farming family, Shimabukuro had always been poor, but he was very innovative and opportunistic. He had a natural talent for adapting things. As a young man in Kyan (Chan) (チャン) Village, he discovered a way to bind tiles to the roofs of homes without using mud, which had been the traditional way. During World War II, as part of the Boetai, he was forced to help construct the airfield in Kadena with his horses and carts. During the October 10, 1944 bombing raid by the Allied Forces, he lost his horses and carts.

Practicing years
Shimabukuro continued to study and develop his skills in both Shorin-Ryu and Goju-Ryu but he was not satisfied that either style held the completeness he was looking for. His interest in weapons (Kobudo) grew, and he sought out the most renowned weapons instructors, because he only knew the one bo (staff) kata, 'Tokumine no Kun' and basic sai techniques he had learned from Chotoku Kyan. He soon became a master in the Bo and Sai weapons. During the late 1950s and early 1960s, he continued his study of Kobudō with one of Moden Yabiku's top students, Shinken Taira. This training took place in Shimabukuro's dojo in Agena. He learned Hama Higa nu Tuifa, Shishi nu Kun, Chatan Yara nu Sai, and Urashi Bo. Shimabuku created Kyan Chotoku nu Sai and Kusanku Sai using sai techniques he learned from Chotoku Kyan. To honor Chotoku Kyan, he named his first sai after him. However, Kyan nu Sai was replaced by 1960 with Kusanku Sai.

Creative years
During the late 1940s Shimabukuro began experimenting with different techniques and kata from the Shorin-Ryu and Goju-Ryu systems as well as Kobudo. He first called the style he was teaching Chan-migwa-te, after Chotoku Kyan's nickname Chan-migwa (チャンミーグヮー). The nickname “Chan-migwa”, meant “small-eyed-Chan." "Chan (チャン)", in the Okinawa dialect “Uchinaguchi”, is “Kyan (喜屋武)." In Uchinaguchi “mi (ミー)” means “eye." The suffix “Gwa (グヮー)” or “Guwa (グヮー)” mean's “small.” So Chan-migwa means “Small-eyed Chan (Kyan)”. He renamed his Chan migwa-te style "Sun nu Su-te" in about 1947 after having trained with Chojun Miyagi "Isshin-ryū" on January 15, 1956.

By the early 1950s Shimabukuro was refining his karate teaching, combining what he felt was the best of the Shorin-Ryu and Goju-Ryu styles, the weapons forms he had studied, and his own techniques. As his experimentation continued, his adaptation of techniques and kata were not widely publicized. He consulted with several of the masters on Okinawa about his wish to develop a new style. Because he was highly respected as a karate master, he received their blessings. These would later be rescinded due to the many radical changes made in traditional Okinawan karate.

One night in 1955, Shimabukuro fell asleep and dreamed of the goddess Isshinryu no Megami (Goddess of Isshinryu). Three Stars appeared, symbolizing the three styles Isshin-ryu derived from, Goju-Ryu, Shorin-Ryu, and Kobudo. The stars might also have represented the Physical, Mental, and Spiritual strength needed for Isshin-ryu. The gray evening sky symbolized serenity, and implied that karate was to be used only for self-defense.

The next morning when Shimabukuro awoke, he felt that his dream had been a divine revelation. On January 15, 1956, he met with his students and told them he was starting a new style of karate. Upon announcing his decision to start a new style, many of his Okinawan students left, including his brother Eizo.

The emblem of Isshinryu no Megami was drawn from Shimabukuro's description by Shosu Nakamine, Eiko Kaneshi's uncle, and was chosen to be the symbol for Isshin-ryū karate.

During his career, Shimabukuro changed his name to “Tatsuo,” meaning “Dragon Man.” Whenever asked about this change, Shimabukuro would reply that “Tatsuo” was his professional karate name. He also was given the nickname, “Sun nu su”, by the mayor of Kyan (Chan) Village. Sun nu su was a name of a dance that was created by Shimabukuro's grandfather.

Teaching years
In 1955, the Third Marine Division of the U.S. Marine Corps was stationed on Okinawa, and the Marine Corps chose Shimabukuro to provide instruction to Marines on the island. As a result of his instruction, Isshin-ryū was spread throughout the United States by returning Marines. The karate that the Marines brought back to dojos in the United States was a blend of what Shimabukuro considered the best of the karate systems.

The first of the Marines to bring Isshin-ryū karate to the United States were Don Nagle and Harold Long. Nagle opened his dojo outside Camp Lejeune, North Carolina in late 1957, while Harold Long's first dojo was in his backyard at Twenty-Nine Palms, California in late 1958. Upon their discharge from service, Nagle moved to Jersey City, New Jersey, and opened the first Isshin-ryū dojo in the Northeast. Harold Long returned home to Knoxville, Tennessee, and opened his first dojo at the Marine Reserve Training Center.

Returning later were Harold Mitchum, Sherman Harill, Steve Armstrong, Ed Johnson, Walter Van Gilson, Clarence Ewing, George Breed, Jim Advincula, Bill Gardo, and Harry Smith and others. George Breed began teaching Isshin-ryū Karate in Atlanta, Georgia in 1961, and then, in Gainesville, Florida from 1966-1969. He remained independent of the Association. In 1960, the Okinawan-American Karate Association was formed, with Harold Mitchum as the association's first president. The name of the association was changed to the American-Okinawan Karate Association due to an error at the print shop.

Shimabukuro made only two trips to the United States to visit his many military students. The first, was to Pittsburgh, Pennsylvania in 1964 from September to late November, sponsored by James Morabeto and William Duessel. During his 1966 trip, he visited Steve Armstrong in Tacoma, Washington, Harold Long in Knoxville, Tennessee, Donald Nagle in Jersey City, New Jersey, and Harry Acklin in Cleveland, Ohio. Armstrong, Long, and Nagle were promoted to the rank of Hachi-Dan (Eighth Degree) during this visit, and each of these men became a driving force in the promotion and spread of Isshin-ryū karate in the United States. Shimabukuro was known to not enjoy traveling far from home. Any further visits representing him were conducted by his student and son-in-law, Angi Uezu.

Another important event took place during this trip. While visiting the dojo of Steve Armstrong (1966), Shimabukuro was filmed performing all 14 Isshin-ryu kata as well as some basic exercise and self-defense techniques. Copies of this film were circulated among the top instructors. It is believed that Shimabukuro did not want to be filmed, and that the recording does not represent a true expression of the various kata.

Shimabukuro continued teaching at his dojo in Agena until his retirement in early 1972. He passed his legacy over to his son, Kichiro Shimabukuro, Eiko Kaneshi was also considered for this honor.

Death

Shimabukuro died from a stroke at his home in the village of Agena on May 30, 1975 at the age of 66.

Modifications from traditional forms

Some of his modifications to karate are:
 The Sunsu kata: a kata exclusive to Isshin-ryu, Sunsu consists mostly of techniques from other kata that Tatsuo found useful and important.
 Reversing the Naihanchi kata, going left first, rather than right. NOTE: The Tomari Naihanchi starts in this fashion so Tatsuo did not change this.

Legacy

Some call him a non-traditionalist, but he had a foot in both worlds. Some kata were modified for use with shoes but his students still trained barefoot when outdoors. Often techniques were taught differently on different days. Once Shimabukuro was sitting drinking awamori with some students. He asked them while pointing toward some bottles "which bottle is best"? Some picked the larger bottles, some the smaller. Tatsuo said that the shape of the bottle was not important. He indicated all bottles were good, that there was no "best bottle" and that all bottles served a purpose.

In 1980, Shimabukuro was the first person inducted into the International Isshin-ryu Karate Association's Isshin-ryū Hall of Fame.

References

Okinawan male karateka
Martial arts school founders
1908 births
1975 deaths
Gōjū-ryū practitioners
20th-century philanthropists
Shōrin-ryū practitioners